His Honour Hugh Eifion Pritchard Roberts known as Eifion Roberts (22 November 1927 – 15 September 2019), was a British Circuit Judge and Liberal Party politician.

Background
He was the elder son of the Rev. and Mrs E.P. Roberts of Anglesey and his younger brother was the politician Wyn Roberts. He was educated at Beaumaris Grammar School and the University College of Wales, Aberystwyth, where he received an LLB with honours, He interrupted his studies to serve as a Flying Officer in the Royal Air Force education branch. He returned to his studies at Exeter College, Oxford where he obtained a BCL. In 1951 he again interrupted his studies, this time to stand as Liberal candidate for the Denbigh Division at the 1951 General Election. Without having the opportunity to nurse the constituency, he was not able to prevent the Liberals from dropping to third place;

He did not stand for parliament again.

Professional career
In 1953 he was called to Bar, after being in Gray's Inn. He practised as a Junior Counsel on the Wales and Chester Circuit from September 1953–April 1971. He was Deputy Chairman of the Anglesey Quarter-Session from 1966 to 1971 and the Denbighshire Quarter-Session from 1970 to 1971. In 1971 he was appointed a Queen's Counsel. He was a Recorder of the Crown Court from 1972 to 1977. He was Assistant Parliamentary Boundary Commissioner for Wales and a Member for Wales of the Crawford Committee on Broadcasting Coverage. In 1977 he was appointed a Circuit Judge. He retired in 1998.

He married, in 1958, Buddug Williams. They had one son and two daughters. In 2009 he was made an Honorary Fellow of Bangor University.

He died on 15 September 2019 at Wrexham Maelor Hospital. His funeral was held at Penygarnedd Chapel, Pentraeth on 30 September 2019 with the burial at Menai Cemetery, Menai Bridge.

References

1927 births
2019 deaths
Liberal Party (UK) parliamentary candidates
Alumni of Exeter College, Oxford
Members of Gray's Inn
Welsh King's Counsel
Circuit judges (England and Wales)
20th-century King's Counsel
21st-century King's Counsel